An ectoparasitic infestation is a parasitic disease caused by organisms that live primarily on the surface of the host.

Examples:
 Scabies
 Crab louse (pubic lice)
 Pediculosis (head lice)
 Lernaeocera branchialis (cod worm)

See also 
 Ectoparasiticide

References

External links 

Parasitism
Ectoparasites